Lunel (Provençal: Lunèl) is a commune in the Hérault department in southern France. According to legend, Lunel was founded by Jews from Jericho in the first century. It had a Jewish population by the first millennium, and an ancient synagogue is located there. 

Lunel station has rail connections to Narbonne, Montpellier, Nîmes and Avignon.

History
The ancient Roman site of Ambrussum is located nearby. The troubadour Folquet de Lunel was from Lunel. 

Lunel was a centre of Jewish learning. It is thought that the family of Rashi (1040–1105), the great Rabbi and commentator, originated in Lunel. Other scholars include Jonathan of Lunel, Meshullam ben Jacob of Lunel, his son Aaron ben Meshullam ben Jacob of Lunel, Abraham ben David who taught in Lunel before moving to Posquières, and Asher ben Meshullam of Lunel.

Lunel was the birthplace of Louis Feuillade (1873–1925), film director from the silent era.  The artist Jean Hugo (1894-1984) lived in the Lunel area for most of his life and painted scenes from the surrounding countryside. The Parc Jean Hugo in the centre of the town was named after him.

Since the 20th century, the town has been a destination for Muslim immigrants from Algeria and other parts of North Africa. In 2015 the New York Times reported that 10% of all the French people killed fighting in Syria for ISIS came from Lunel.

Population

See also
 Hachmei Provence
Communes of the Hérault department

References

External links

Official website (in French)

Communes of Hérault
Historic Jewish communities in Europe